The Jablanica District is one of nine administrative districts of Southern and Eastern Serbia. It expands in the south-eastern parts of Serbia. As of 2022 census, the district has a population of 185,952 inhabitants. The administrative center of the district is the city of Leskovac.

Municipalities
The district encompasses the municipalities of:
 Leskovac
 Bojnik
 Lebane
 Medveđa
 Vlasotince
 Crna Trava

Demographics

As of 2022 census, the district has a population of 185,952 inhabitants.

Ethnic groups
Ethnic composition of the Jablanica District (per 2011 census):

History and culture
Famous cultural-historic monuments in this District are: the Roman necropolis in Mala Kopasnica originating from 2nd century AD, a late Roman-early Byzantine (6th century AD) town of Caričin Grad or Iustiniana Prima, the Jasunjski Monasteries dedicated to the Virgin of Transfiguration and St. John the Baptist, built in 1499 as the endowment of monastery sister Ksenija, as well as the church of St. John the Baptist from  16th century, being a true pearl among monuments.

See also
 Administrative divisions of Serbia
 Districts of Serbia

Notes

References

Note: All official material made by the Government of Serbia is public by law. Information was taken from the official website.

External links

 

 
Districts of Southern and Eastern Serbia